Tomori Stadium is a multi-use stadium in Berat, Albania.  It is currently used mostly for football matches and is the home ground of Tomori. The stadium holds 17,890 people.

International matches
The Tomori Stadium has hosted 1 friendly match of the Albania national football team

References

Football venues in Albania
Buildings and structures in Berat
FK Tomori Berat
Sports venues completed in 1985
1985 establishments in Albania